The Mackay Ring Road is a bypass route near Mackay, Queensland, Australia The proposed full length of the road is  long and will be built in 3 stages. Stage 1 opened in September 2020.

Stage 1 is 11.34 km in length and connects the Bruce Highway to the south of Mackay (at Stockroute Road) with the Bruce Highway to the north of Mackay (near Bald Hill Road). It includes a new bridge over the Pioneer River and an interchange with the Peak Downs Highway. It provides a bypass of Mackay for Bruce Highway traffic that is immune to flooding and free of signalised intersections. Stage 1 of the project was expected to cost $540 million, 80% of the funding was from the Commonwealth and the remaining 20% from Queensland.

Stage 2 is 8.2 km in length. It will connect Stage 1 near the Bruce Highway at Glenella to Harbour Road at Mackay Harbour. The route will follow the Mackay Harbour Railway (Port Rail Line).

Stage 3 is 1.4 km in length. An additional connection from Stage 2 to the Port and Slade Point Road.

It was expected that many vehicles would bypass the city once completed.

Construction

Milestones
 October 2011 - Planning Study commences
 February 2012 - Analysis and evaluation of alignment options
 May 2012 - Business Case for preferred alignment commences, community consultations
 13 November 2012 - Approval to proceed to design stage
 January 2014 - Preliminary design phase begins, Initial ground survey and soil testing
 2015 - Detailed design work commenced
 Mid 2017 - Construction of stage 1 commenced
 5 September 2020 - Completion of Stage 1 and opening.

Upgrades

Extend to Bald Hill Road
A project to extend the ring road to Bald Hill Road, at a cost of $497.3 million, was in detailed design in November 2021.

Mackay Port access
A project to provide access to Mackay Port, at a cost of $350 million, was in planning in July 2022,

See also

 Bruce Highway
 Mackay Transport

References

External links
 Department of Transport and Main Roads - Projects - Mackay Ring Road

Proposed roads in Australia
Mackay, Queensland
Ring roads in Australia
Roads in Queensland